Angry Birds Rio is a discontinued 2011 puzzle video game developed and published by Rovio Entertainment. It is the third installment in the Angry Birds series. The game was released on March 22, 2011 and promoted as a marketing tie-in with the 20th Century Fox and Blue Sky Studios co-produced animated film Rio. While utilizing the same basic gameplay as Angry Birds, Angry Birds Rio added a number of new elements, most notably the first use of boss levels. Angry Birds Rio was discontinued on February 3, 2020 along with Angry Birds Star Wars, Angry Birds Space and Angry Birds Star Wars II, with the games also being pulled out of the app stores.

Gameplay
In Rio, Red, Chuck, and the Blues have been birdnapped and taken to Rio by the Smugglers under the orders of an evil cockatoo named Nigel, the main antagonist from the film. Just as in the original Angry Birds, players use a slingshot to launch the birds at nearby structures, with the intent of hitting targets located on or within them. Instead of the pigs that have stolen eggs, players must now rescue caged exotic birds or defeat Nigel's marmosets, depending on the level being played. Because of the game's setting, several characters from Rio make appearances. Blu and Jewel both feature as types of bird exclusive to this game, along with all the existing birds from the series.

The game also includes the first boss fights to appear in the series, when the player uses the birds to defeat Nigel, as well as Mauro, the leader of the marmosets. In other levels, Luiz helps defeat the marmosets and destroys materials and blocks to get the player extra points, as well as hidden items to collect as the player progresses through the game.

Release
Angry Birds Rio initially included two chapters, "Smugglers' Den" and "Jungle Escape", each with 30 levels. Since then, the game has been expanded with three additional 30-level chapters called "Beach Volley" (released in May 2011), "Carnival Upheaval" (released in June 2011), and "Airfield Chase" (released in August 2011) along with a 15-level chapter, "Golden Beachball", which is unlocked by finding a hidden item in "Beach Volley" (iOS, Android) or by entering a redeem code from Rio DVD (PC, Mac). A final chapter named "Smugglers' Plane" (released in November 2011) was released with initially with 15 levels, with the final 15 levels released later (January 2012). Each chapter has a special fruit that may be rarely found as gold. "Smugglers' Den" has pineapples, "Jungle Escape" has bananas, "Beach Volley" has watermelons, "Carnival Upheaval" has papayas, "Airfield Chase" has apples, "Smugglers' Plane" has mangoes, "Market Mayhem" has strawberries, and "Rocket Rumble" has golden rockets. In July 2013, the "Golden Beachball" episode received 15 more levels, golden cherries, a new background, and this episode is now available from the start of the game.

In March 2012, the Trophy Room update was released, with 12 new levels that are each unlocked when a player finishes a chapter or collects all 15 of a certain golden fruit. This update was first released in the Android (Amazon Appstore ad-free) version before making its way to iOS.
On December 18, 2012, a new update landed for iOS and Android adding 24 new levels. This levels are earned by getting from 30 to 70 stars on each episode or by earning 10 Mighty Eagles' Feathers on each episode (4 extra levels on each episode). This episode also added Power-Ups. The Power-Ups were Super Seeds and Sling Scope from the Angry Birds original app and 2 new power-ups (Samba Burst and TNT Drop, which this has been seen on a previous Angry Birds Friends Christmas Tournament). On March 11, 2013, another update was released, adding a "Market Mayhem" episode with 34 levels (3 stars levels and 1 Mighty Eagle level). On July 25, 2013, AB Rios app icon was updated and Golden Beachball added a golden fruit and 15 new levels. In addition, The trophy room levels were combined into the episode they were earned from.

Four Angry Birds Rio episodes — all visually tied to Rio 2 — were released from December 2013 to July 2014 and these episodes featured refreshed graphics. The Timber Tumble episode adds a hint feature that tells where to sling the bird. In the July 2015, a game update added bird coins that allow players to unlock levels that were previously locked.

Inclusion in Angry Birds Trilogy/Ports
At the 2012 Electronic Entertainment Expo in Los Angeles, California, Rovio and distribution partner Activision announced plans to bring Angry Birds Rio and two other games, the original Angry Birds and Angry Birds Seasons to the PlayStation 3, Xbox 360 and Nintendo 3DS. Bundled together as Angry Birds Trilogy, the games were built specifically for their respective consoles, taking advantage of their unique features, such as support for PlayStation Move, Kinect, high-definition displays, and glasses-free 3D visuals. Angry Birds Trilogy was also released for the Nintendo Wii and Wii U.

Discontinuation 

In 2020, Along with Angry Birds Star Wars II, Angry Birds Space and Angry Birds Star Wars, the game was subsequently discontinued on February 3, 2020.

Reception

The game has received generally favorable reviews, with a Metacritic score of 87/100 based on 18 reviews. Ryan Rigney of GamePro saying the iOS version "boasts some notable improvements on its predecessors" and Levi Buchanan of IGN, in his review of the Android version, calling the game "a smart, snappy new chapter for the series". Jim Squires of Gamezebo complimented the game's attempts to add new material and mechanics, saying "some evolution needs to happen if it wants to have the long term staying power of a Mario or a Pac-Man." However, Squires did take issue with the new boss battles, calling them "a little anti-climactic". Tracy Erickson of Pocket Gamer noted that "what Angry Birds Rio lacks in new ideas and freshness, it makes up in quality gameplay and good value".

In 2011, Angry Birds Rio had been downloaded more than 10 million times and had been one of the top downloaded games in 2012 at the Apple App Store, Google Play Store and again at the Google Play Store in 2014.

See also
 List of most downloaded Android applications

References

External links

 

2011 video games
Android (operating system) games
Rio
BlackBerry 10 games
Blue Sky Studios video games
Crossover video games
Delisted digital-only games
IOS games
MacOS games
Products and services discontinued in 2020
Puzzle video games
Symbian games
Video games developed in Finland
Video games set in Brazil
Video games based on films
WebOS games
Windows games
Windows Phone games
Single-player video games